King Edward VII was the monarch of the United Kingdom of Great Britain and Ireland and of the British Empire from 22 January 1901 until his death on 6 May 1910.

During his reign Edward was served by a total of 13 prime ministers; 5 from Australia, 4 from the United Kingdom, 3 from New Zealand and 1 from the Dominion of Canada.

Australia

Canada

Cape Colony

Newfoundland

New Zealand

United Kingdom

See also
British Empire
Constitutional monarchy

Prime Ministers of Edward VII
Commonwealth realms
Edward VII, Prime Ministers
Edward VII
Edward VII